Steven Pruitt (born April 17, 1984) is an American Wikipedia editor with the highest number of edits made to the English Wikipedia, at over 5 million, having made at least one edit to one-third of all English Wikipedia articles. Pruitt first began editing Wikipedia in 2004. He has also created more than 33,000 Wikipedia articles. Pruitt was named as one of the 25 most important influencers on the Internet by Time magazine in 2017.

Pruitt edits under the pseudonym Ser Amantio di Nicolao, which is a reference to a minor character in Giacomo Puccini's 1917 opera Gianni Schicchi. He has stated that he aims to fight gender bias on Wikipedia, promoting the inclusion of women via the Women in Red project.

Early life and education
Pruitt was born on April 17, 1984, in San Antonio, Texas, the only child of Alla Pruitt, a Russian Jewish immigrant, and Donald Pruitt of Richmond, Virginia. His mother emigrated from the Soviet Union under the loosening of the policy of Jewish migration under Leonid Brezhnev, while his father worked as a college professor in Virginia. They met when they were both teachers in the Defense Language Institute's Russian Department at Lackland Air Force Base, close to San Antonio.

While growing up, Pruitt was an avid reader of classical literature and mystery stories by Agatha Christie and Ngaio Marsh.

Pruitt graduated from St. Stephen's & St. Agnes School in Alexandria, Virginia, in 2002. He attended the College of William & Mary, where he sang as part of a choir, and he graduated in 2006 with a degree in art history.

Career 
In 2017, Pruitt was a contractor for U.S. Customs and Border Protection, where he worked with records and information and preferred to work on paper. In 2020, he became a records manager at the Defense Health Agency. As of 2021, he works for Chenega IT Enterprise Services, a contractor for the Defense Health Agency.

Wikipedia editing
Pruitt began editing Wikipedia in June 2004. His first Wikipedia article was about his great great grandfather, Peter Francisco, a Portuguese-born American Revolutionary War hero known as the "Virginia Hercules." His favorite article to work on is the Virginia Pohick Church. He created his current account in January 2006 while a senior at the College of William & Mary. Prior to creating his current account, he had edited under several accounts for which he kept forgetting the password. Being unemployed during the 2008 financial crisis, Pruitt spent hours editing, which sometimes prevented him from getting job interviews when potential interviewers confused the site with Julian Assange's WikiLeaks. In 2015, he surpassed editor Justin Knapp for the most edits. By February 2019, Pruitt had made over three million edits to Wikipedia, more than any other editor on the English Wikipedia, and he made over four million edits by February 2021. The same year, he became an Administrator. Pruitt has also created more than 33,000 Wikipedia articles, the seventh-highest tally out of any Wikipedia editor. According to Northern Virginia Magazine, "Pruitt has not literally pressed the 'edit' button 4.4 million times. One method he has used to achieve his astonishing numbers is a software tool that allows a user to make numerous identical edits simultaneously. For example, he could italicize every mention of Northern Virginia magazine across Wikipedia where it currently appears in standard font. Yet it is claimed he has not 'cheated' his way to the top spot, since that software is also available to others." 

As a contributing member of the Women in Red WikiProject, his Wikipedia edits have included creating articles on more than 600 women, in order to counter the site's gender gap. Even though the majority of his work is done alone, he is also a member of the WikiProject Virginia. Pruitt, who identifies as an inclusionist and a WikiGnome, spends between three and four hours daily editing, with more on the weekends. The longest Pruitt has gone without editing Wikipedia is two or three weeks. He made the one billionth edit on Wikipedia on January 13, 2021, to the page Death Breathing.  Concurrently several hundred thousand early Wikipedia edits were lost during a software upgrade.

Pruitt has credited his love of knowledge to his mother's stories of growing up in the Soviet Union.

Interviews
Pruitt was featured on CBS This Morning in January 2019. In the interview, Pruitt described the first article he worked on (about Peter Francisco), known as the "Virginia Hercules," and his commitment to help boost Wikipedia's coverage of notable women, one area in which Wikipedia critics have noted the site falls short.

Personal life 
Pruitt's non-Wikipedia-related interests include the Capitol Hill Chorale, in which he sings. He is an avid fan of opera, which started from his parents' inculcation at an early age, and this passion provided inspiration for his Wikipedia username "Ser Amantio di Nicolao" – after a minor character in the 1918 Puccini opera Gianni Schicchi. Pruitt is also a fan of classical music. As of 2018, he is single and living with his parents as their caregiver due to the high costs of housing in the Washington, D.C., area.

Distinctions
 Times "The 25 Most Influential People on the Internet" (2017)

References

External links 
 
 Meet the man behind a third of what's on Wikipedia – CBS This Morning's piece on Pruitt

1984 births
Living people
21st-century American male writers
American people of Portuguese descent
American people of Russian-Jewish descent
American Wikimedians
College of William & Mary alumni
History of Wikipedia
Wikipedia people
Writers from Alexandria, Virginia
Writers from San Antonio